Davao City's 2nd congressional district is one of the three congressional districts of the Philippines in Davao City. It has been represented in the House of Representatives since 1987. The district covers four city districts located to the north and northeast of the city's poblacion or downtown commercial area, namely Agdao, Buhangin, Bunawan and Paquibato. It is currently represented in the 18th Congress by Vincent Garcia of the Hugpong ng Pagbabago (HNP).

Representation history

Election results

2022

2019

2016

2013

2010

See also
Legislative districts of Davao City

References

Congressional districts of the Philippines
Politics of Davao City
1987 establishments in the Philippines
Congressional districts of the Davao Region
Constituencies established in 1987